Cristian Rafael Pache (born November 19, 1998) is a Dominican professional baseball outfielder for the Oakland Athletics of Major League Baseball (MLB). He made his MLB debut in 2020 with the Atlanta Braves.

Early life
Pache, the second of three children, was born in Santo Domingo Centro in the Dominican Republic to a factory worker and a homemaker.

Career

Minor leagues
Pache signed with the Atlanta Braves in July 2015 for $1.4 million. At the time of his signing, Baseball America ranked Pache the 21st-best international free agent; MLB.com ranked him tenth. Pache was assigned to the Gulf Coast League Braves in June 2016, and after batting .283 with 11 runs batted in (RBI) in 27 games. Pache was promoted to the Danville Braves, where he finished the season with a .333 batting average, ten RBI, and a .775 on-base plus slugging (OPS) in 30 games.

Pache spent the 2017 season with the Rome Braves, where he batted .281 with 42 RBI and 32 stolen bases in 119 games. He was named a South Atlantic League All-Star at midseason. 

Pache was named to MLB Pipeline's All-Defensive team for 2018, and was invited to spring training at the start of the 2018 season. He was subsequently assigned to the Florida Fire Frogs. In June, Pache received a Florida State League All-Star selection. At the A-Advanced level, he played in 93 games, driving in 40 runs, hitting eight home runs, and recording a .285 batting average. On August 1, Pache was promoted to the Mississippi Braves. In 29 games for Mississippi, he hit .260 with one home run and seven RBI in 29 games. In August 2018, it was announced that Pache was placed on the preliminary Arizona Fall League (AFL) roster. He hit .290/.318/.387 through 14 games, and was named to the AFL All-Star Game. As a prospect, Pache drew attention for his defensive skills. Throughout 2018, he began displaying an increased ability to hit for power. 

Pache was named to the 2019 MLB Pipeline's All-Defensive team. He spent time in major league camp prior to the start of the 2019 season, and was subsequently reassigned to Mississippi. At midseason, Pache was named to the All-Star Futures Game. While playing in the Southern League, Pache hit for a .278 batting average, with 28 doubles, eight triples, 11 home runs, 50 runs, 53 runs batted in, and eight stolen bases. On August 6, 2019, Pache made his International League debut with the Gwinnett Stripers. Over 130 games between both clubs, Pache batted .277/.340/.462 with 12 home runs and 61 RBI.

Atlanta Braves

2020
The Braves added Pache to their 40-man roster following the 2019 season to protect him from becoming eligible to be selected in the Rule 5 draft. Prior to the 2020 season, MLB.com ranked Pache the eleventh-best prospect in Minor League Baseball. In 2020, he was invited to the Braves' spring training for the second time, and was eventually assigned to Gwinnett. The 2020 Minor League Baseball season was cancelled due to the COVID-19 pandemic, and Pache spent time at the Braves' alternate training site when the season resumed. He was promoted to the major league roster on August 18, 2020. Pache's MLB debut came against the Philadelphia Phillies, on August 21, 2020, as the starting left fielder. That night, he registered his first big league hit, a single off left-hander Cole Irvin. In limited action during the 2020 regular season, Pache went one-for-four at the plate.

Pache was named to the roster for the 2020 NL Wild Card Series. He scored the game-winning run in the bottom of the 13th inning in Game 1 for the Braves. Pache had entered the game as a pinch runner, then scored on a hit by Freddie Freeman. Pache replaced Adam Duvall in the second inning of Game 1 of the 2020 National League Championship Series. In Game 2, Pache notched his first career major league RBI and his first career big league home run, in Game 3.

2021
Prior to the start of the 2021 regular season, Pache began wearing uniform number 25 to honor former Braves center fielder Andruw Jones. Pache had worn the number throughout his minor league career, but the number was unavailable at the time of Pache's major league debut, as it was being worn by catcher Tyler Flowers. Pache hit his first regular season home run, a grand slam, while facing Tommy Milone in a game against the Toronto Blue Jays on May 1, 2021. On May 14, the Braves placed Pache on the injured list due to a hamstring injury that he suffered during a game against the Toronto Blue Jays. On May 29, Pache was sent to Gwinnett to complete a minor league rehabilitation assignment. On June 2, the Braves activated Pache and immediately optioned him back to Gwinnett. Pache spent the remainder of the minor league season there. He hit .265 with 11 home runs, 44 RBIs and 9 stolen bases. For the Braves, he batted .111 in 63 at bats.

On October 12, 2021, Pache was placed on the Braves postseason roster, replacing Jorge Soler, who had tested positive for COVID-19 before game four of the National League Division Series against the Milwaukee Brewers. The Braves continued to carry Pache on their roster as they advanced to the National League Championship Series against the Los Angeles Dodgers. However, he was removed on October 21 when Soler was deemed eligible to return to the team. The Braves eventually won the 2021 World Series, giving the Braves their first title since 1995.

Oakland Athletics
On March 14, 2022, the Braves traded Pache, Shea Langeliers, Ryan Cusick, and Joey Estes to the Oakland Athletics in exchange for Matt Olson. In Pache's first season with the Athletics, he played in 91 games, had slash line of .166/.218/.241 and batted in 18 runs.

References

External links

1998 births
Living people
Atlanta Braves players
Danville Braves players
Dominican Republic expatriate baseball players in the United States
Estrellas Orientales players
Florida Fire Frogs players
Gulf Coast Braves players
Gwinnett Stripers players
Major League Baseball outfielders
Major League Baseball players from the Dominican Republic
Mississippi Braves players
Oakland Athletics players
Peoria Javelinas players
Rome Braves players
Sportspeople from Santo Domingo